Lo Ching-lung (born 20 August 1985) is a Taiwanese baseball player who most recently played with the Uni-President Lions of the Chinese Professional Baseball League.

Career
Lo was signed out of high school by the Colorado Rockies for $1.4 million. He debuted as a professional in 2002 with the Casper Rockies, going 5–5 with a 4.95 ERA and .290 opponent average as the young man on the staff. Baseball America rated him as the number 13 prospect in the Pioneer League, between Jonathan Broxton and Ubaldo Jiménez among pitchers. They also ranked him as the number 14 Colorado prospect entering 2003.

In 2003, the teenager had a 3–7, 2.85 record for the Tri-City Dust Devils.
He tied for the Northwest League in losses but much of that came from poor run support as his club only scored 9 runs in his 7 defeats. He was 10th in the Northwest League in ERA. Baseball America ranked him as the 10th-best Northwest League prospect.

Lo had a 4–3, 5.05 record for the 2004 Asheville Tourists. In 2005, the Tainan native returned to Asheville, where he was 7–9 with a 5.65 ERA and surrendered 23 gopher balls, the most in the South Atlantic League.

Ching-Lung improved his record to 10–5 in 2006 with the Modesto Nuts but his ERA remained elevated at 5.39. He spent 2006 in the Hawaii Winter League, going 4–3 with a 4.97 ERA for the Waikiki BeachBoys. He led the staff in wins but his ERA was fourth-highest among the five starters. It was an international rotation, featuring Dutch hurler Rick van den Hurk, Japan's Atsushi Nohmi, Mexican Marco Estrada, Taiwan's Lo and an American in the fifth slot.

Lo moved up to AA in 2007 and had an 8–8, 5.61 record for the Tulsa Drillers. He allowed a .300 average. His fastball, once timed at 95 mph, was down to the 88–90 range. He was 0–2 with a 6.75 ERA for the Peoria Javelinas in the Arizona Fall League. He was the fourth Taiwan native to play in the AFL, following Chin-Feng Chen, Chin-lung Hu and Yung-Chi Chen.

In 2008, he was again 8-8 for Tulsa, this time with a 5.25 ERA. One positive was his first career shutout.

International career
He represented Chinese Taipei national baseball team at the 2013 World Baseball Classic.

References

External links

CPBL

1985 births
Living people
Asheville Tourists players
Asian Games medalists in baseball
Asian Games silver medalists for Chinese Taipei
Baseball pitchers
Baseball players at the 2010 Asian Games
Casper Rockies players
Colorado Springs Sky Sox players
Lancaster Barnstormers players
Medalists at the 2010 Asian Games
Modesto Nuts players
Peoria Javelinas players
Taiwanese expatriate baseball players in the United States
Tri-City Dust Devils players
Tulsa Drillers players
Uni-President 7-Eleven Lions players
Uni-President Lions players
Waikiki Beach Boys players
2013 World Baseball Classic players
Baseball players from Kaohsiung
Uni-President 7-Eleven Lions coaches